León de Garro y Javier was a Basque nobleman, Count of Javier and  Viscount of Zolina.

Biography 

León was born in Pamplona, Kingdom of Navarre, son of Jerónimo de Garro and Ana de Javier, belonging to the Basque nobility. He was married to the noble lady Inés de Coloma, daughter of don Pedro Coloma, Lord of Malon and Maria de Luna.

In 1604, León de Garro was appointed Alcalde ordinario in Pamplona.

References

External links 
navarchivo.com

16th-century nobility from the Kingdom of Navarre
People from Pamplona
Coloma family